Peter McGowan is a former municipal politician. He was the supervisor of the Town of Islip in New York.

Biography 
In March 2006, he resigned and pleaded guilty to charges of receiving a bribe, grand larceny, and offering a false instrument for filing — taking kickbacks and stealing from his campaign account. On May 4, 2006, he was sentenced to three months in jail, followed by probation and community service.

In 2001, he was involved with a controversial proposal to impose a $50,000 fee on airplanes landing or taking off from the town's Long Island MacArthur Airport after 11 p.m. and before 6:30 a.m., although the proposed fee was later withdrawn. The airport's concourse was named after him but was later renamed the Veterans Memorial Concourse.

In September 2005, town officials condemned the Fairwood Gardens apartment building and issued eviction orders to its tenants to leave, but later withdrew the eviction orders and subsequently settled out of court a lawsuit brought by some tenants. At the time, McGowan denied knowing in advance about the evictions.

He clashed with other council members over the issue of the town's term limits, which they supported and he opposed.

References

People from Islip (town), New York
Town supervisors in New York (state)
Living people
American politicians convicted of bribery
New York (state) politicians convicted of crimes
Year of birth missing (living people)